Fotografiks is a book by David Carson published in 1999.

References 

1999 books